Bent Jørgensen (born 7 May 1923) is a Danish cyclist. He competed in the 4,000 metres team pursuit event at the 1952 Summer Olympics.

References

External links
 

1923 births
Possibly living people
Danish male cyclists
Olympic cyclists of Denmark
Cyclists at the 1952 Summer Olympics
Sportspeople from Odense